Waterhen may refer to:
 Common moorhen or common waterhen, a bird species in the rail family
 Amaurornis rails, a genus of birds in the rail family
 Various other birds of the family Rallidae (rails) may be informally called waterhens
 Waterhen Indian Reserve No. 45, Northern Affairs Community in the Canadian province of Manitoba
 Waterhen River (disambiguation), more than one river in Canada
 HMAS Waterhen, one ship and one shore establishment in the Royal Australian Navy